Fernando Morán Escudero (born 27 April 1976) is a Spanish retired footballer who played as a midfielder.

He amassed La Liga totals of 140 games and six goals over eight seasons, almost exclusively at the service of Racing de Santander. In a 19-year senior career he added 342 matches and 42 goals in Segunda División, in representation of nine teams.

Club career
Morán was born in Madrid, played youth football with local and La Liga giants Real Madrid. He kickstarted his professional career with the club's reserves, spending one and a half seasons in Segunda División.

In late January 1997, Morán signed with Racing de Santander of the top flight, making his debut in the competition on the 26th by coming on as a late substitute in a 0–0 away draw against Sevilla FC. He scored his first league goal on 9 September 2000, a last-minute 2–2 equaliser at Real Sociedad, as the Cantabrians went on to suffer relegation; during his beginnings with the club he was also loaned twice, to second level sides CD Numancia and CD Ourense.

Morán left Racing in June 2005, joining Cádiz CF of the same league. He was sparingly played over the course of two seasons, being relegated in his first.

Until his retirement in June 2013 at the age of 37, Morán subsequently competed solely in the second tier, appearing for Albacete Balompié, Hércules CF, Gimnàstic de Tarragona and AD Alcorcón. In the 2009–10 campaign he netted a career-best seven goals in 39 games for Catalonia's Nàstic, helping them to the 18th position and narrowly avoid relegation.

Personal life
Morán worked with several NGO, also sponsoring underprivileged youths.

He served as drummer for rock band Hacia donde.

References

External links

Stats and bio at Cadistas1910 

1976 births
Living people
Footballers from Madrid
Spanish footballers
Association football midfielders
La Liga players
Segunda División players
Segunda División B players
Real Madrid C footballers
Real Madrid Castilla footballers
Racing de Santander players
CD Numancia players
CD Ourense footballers
Cádiz CF players
Albacete Balompié players
Hércules CF players
Gimnàstic de Tarragona footballers
AD Alcorcón footballers
Spain youth international footballers